Mitali Mukherjee (born 6 December 1979) is an Indian news anchor, financial journalist, writer and TEDx speaker. She was news editor and key anchor of CNBC TV18. She was previously with The TV Today group, BBC World and Doordarshan. She has also consulted with Mint, the World Bank and The Indian Express. Presently, she is working with The Wire.

Early life
Mitali was born in Ambala, Haryana. She's an army kid who finished school at The Army Public School in New Delhi. She then graduated in Political Science Honours from Delhi University and was awarded a gold medal. Post-graduation, Mitali went to Indian Institute of Mass Communication (IIMC) under the Ministry of I&B where she specialised in TV and Broadcast Journalism. She won the Star TV Scholarship and was awarded a gold medal. More recently she has also got a post graduate qualification in working with children with learning disabilities from SNDT University Mumbai where she got an A+.

Career
Mitali began her career as Associate Producer, Miditech in 2001 where she shot on location, scripted and edited several documentaries for BBC World including Commando, a docu-series that covered real – time the most intensive training module run by the Indian Army for its officers.

In 2002, she joined the nation's news broadcast channel Doordarshan, where she anchored the evening prime-time news. In 2003, she joined TV Today's flagship English news channel Headlines Today where she anchored the primetime evening bulletin and also reported on ground from strife hit areas like Jammu & Kashmir.

From 2004, Mitali was Markets and News Editor at CNBC TV18, where she anchored the flagship show, Bazaar, Business Lunch and Closing Bell. She resigned in 2014.

In 2016, she co-founded MoneyMile a digital video platform where her core focus was sharing financial investing advise to help women become financially independent and empowered. She has also worked as Consulting Business Editor at Editorji, a digital news platform started by Vikram Chandra, where she anchored the key General Elections of 2019 and the Interim Budget in February 2019 and the Union Budget in July 2019.

Mitali has been Consulting Business Editor at The Wire, where she has interviewed faces like Dr. C Rangarajan (Former RBI Governor), Dr. Shashi Tharoor (Member of Parliament), Dr. Viral Acharya (Former RBI Deputy Governor), D Subbarao (Former RBI Governor), P Chidambaram, Hemant Soren, Deepender Hooda, Dr. Thomas Isaac, Dr Amit Mitra, Adar Poonawalla, T.V. Narendran, Ashwini Deshpande to name a few.

In October 2020 she was also invited to be Fellow at Observer Research Foundation (ORF) India's premier think-tank where she has written on gender issues, green finance and media ethics.

Awards and achievements
Mitali has been a vocal supporter of financial freedom for women. A number of her shows cover this topic and she has also spoken at many gatherings on gender equity.

Mitali is a Chevening fellow for the South Asia Journalism Fellowship 202. She is also a TEDx speaker, Raisina AFGG (Asian Forum for Global Governance) Young Fellow and Steering Committee member of AIYD (Australia India Youth Dialogue).

She has been into theatre and the performing arts since her college days. In 2020, she featured in a cameo appearance in Mira Nair’s ‘A Suitable Boy’ that was aired on Netflix.

References

Indian women television journalists
Indian television news anchors
Indian women television presenters
21st-century Indian women writers
21st-century Indian journalists
1979 births
Living people